Laminacauda peruensis is a species of sheet weaver found in Peru. It was described by Millidge in 1985.

References

Linyphiidae
Spiders described in 1985
Fauna of Peru
Spiders of South America